The Lord High Commissioner to the General Assembly of the Church of Scotland is the Scottish monarch's personal representative to the General Assembly of the Church of Scotland (the Kirk), reflecting the Church's role as the national church of Scotland and the monarch's role as protector and member of that Church.

History
Lord High Commissioners were appointed to the Parliament of the Kingdom of Scotland between 1603 and 1707 as the monarch's personal representative. The Act of Union 1707 made this function redundant, but a Lord High Commissioner to the General Assembly of the Church of Scotland has been appointed each year, as the monarch's personal representative, since 1690.

The right of the monarch to be present at the General Assembly is enshrined in Church of Scotland's confessional standard, the Westminster Confession of Faith, which says that the "civil magistrate... hath power to call synods, to be present at them, and to provide that whatsoever is transacted in them be according to the mind of God" (XXIII.3).

Prior to 1929, the General Assembly was held in the former Tolbooth Highland St John's Church on Edinburgh's Royal Mile (this building is no longer used as a church, instead being converted into "The Hub" for the Edinburgh International Festival society), where a Throne was provided for the use of the Lord High Commissioner. The union of the Church of Scotland and the United Free Church of Scotland took place in 1929. Since 1930 the General Assembly has always met in the former United Free Church Assembly Hall on The Mound, Edinburgh. The Lord High Commissioner sits on the Throne in the Royal Gallery, which is technically "outside" the Assembly Hall—symbolising the independence of the Church in matters spiritual from state interference. The first Assembly of the newly united church in 1929 was held in halls in Annandale Street, Edinburgh (now a bus garage), the only building large enough. Difficulty in accessing the Royal Gallery in this temporary location led to a seemingly trivial but nevertheless embarrassing dispute over protocol, whereby the Lord High Commissioner (the Earl of Inverness, later King George VI) would have had to enter through the Assembly Hall itself—an act of symbolic state interference in the hard-won spiritual independence of the church. The Moderator, Dr John White, was adamant that this would be unacceptable, even suggesting that the post of Lord High Commissioner could be dispensed with. Eventually a suitable arrangement was agreed upon and the office of Lord High Commissioner has survived.

Functions
The office has always been largely ceremonial. The person appointed invariably has a distinguished record of public service in Scotland as well as having close connections with the church, often being an Elder of the Church of Scotland.

On behalf of the monarch, the Lord High Commissioner attends the General Assembly, makes opening and closing addresses to the Assembly, and carries out a number of official visits and ceremonial functions (not all related to the Church of Scotland). At the formal opening of the General Assembly, the Principal Clerk reads out the Royal Warrant appointing the Lord High Commissioner, who is then invited to address the Assembly. All ministers, elders and deacons appointed by Presbyteries to attend the General Assembly are known as "Commissioners" and have voting powers; the Lord High Commissioner, however, has no vote, nor may he/she intervene in debates.

Apart from his/her opening and closing addresses, the Lord High Commissioner makes no further intervention in Assembly debates but will be in daily attendance for at least part of each day's business. Following the Assembly, the Lord High Commissioner personally informs The King about the business of the week.

The Lord High Commissioner also visits the General Assembly of the Free Church of Scotland annually.

Form of address
While the General Assembly is meeting, the Lord High Commissioner is treated as if a regent. By custom, he or she is addressed as "Your Grace" and is greeted with a bow or curtsey. When the Princess Royal was appointed in 1996, she was styled as "Her Grace" for the duration rather than her normal dynastic style "Her Royal Highness" because the Lord High Commissioner is ranked higher in the order of precedence.

If a woman is appointed to the office, the alternative title "His Majesty's High Commissioner" may, if requested, be used. Margaret Herbison was the first woman to hold the post (1970 & 1971).

Residence
Since 1834 the Lord High Commissioner has resided at the Palace of Holyroodhouse and gave a garden party for Commissioners to the General Assembly on the Saturday afternoon of Assembly week and other hospitality. He or she is entitled to use the Scottish Royal Banner, and has precedence immediately after The King and before the rest of the Royal Family.  Even his or her official car receives special treatment and, except for the King's, is the only vehicle in the country not to have number plates. However, the plates are re-attached during the closing speech of the Assembly, and the Lord High Commissioner returns to his royal but temporary residence as an ordinary citizen. In recent years, the garden party has been replaced by the "Heart and Soul" event, held in Princes Street Gardens and attended by the Lord High Commissioner.

Household
There is a Household of His Grace the Lord High Commissioner. This includes the Purse Bearer (who is the head of the Household), Chaplain, Aides-de-Camp (three in 1949), a Lady-in-Waiting, Extra Lady-in-Waiting, and Maids of Honour (three in 1949). The Macebearer bears the Lord President's Mace or the Old Exchequer Mace. The Master of the Horse is no longer appointed. The subordinate staff further includes the Assistant to the Purse Bearer, and a Lady's Maid. The Household make no financial demands on the funds of the Church of Scotland, which are devoted exclusively to the Parish and Mission work of the Kirk.

List of Purse Bearers
c.1930: (Sir) John Charles Couper  
1930–1958: Lt Col Sir Edward Daymonde-Stevenson 
1959–1960: David Charles Scott-Moncrieff 
1961–1969: Sir Alastair Blair 
1969–1988: Sir Charles Fraser 
1988–2001: Robin Blair 
2001–present: Tom Murray

List of Lords High Commissioner

1580: The Laird of Lundie & Sir James Balfour of Pittendreich or James Halyburton
1581: William Cunningham, 4th Laird of Caprington
April 1582: Ralph Kerr
October 1582: James Halyburton & Colonel William Stewart of Houston
incomplete
1638: James Hamilton, 1st Duke of Hamilton
1639: The Earl of Traquair
1640: none
1641: The Earl of Wemyss
1642: The Earl of Dunfermline
1643: Sir Thomas Hope
1644–1645: none
1646: Letter from the King regretting that no Commissioner could be sent
1647–1650: none
1651: The Earl of Balcarres
1652: none
1653: none
1653–1690: no General Assembly
1690: The Lord Carmichael
1692: The Earl of Lothian
1694–1699: The Lord Carmichael
1700: The Viscount Seafield (became an earl before serving again in 1703)
1701: The Earl of Annandale (became a marquess before serving again in 1705 and 1711)
1702: The Earl of Marchmont
1703: The Earl of Seafield (succeeded as Earl of Findlater before serving again in 1724)
1704: The Lord Ross
1705: The Marquess of Annandale
1706–1710: The 1st Earl of Glasgow
1711: The Marquess of Annandale
1712–1714: The 1st Duke of Atholl
1715–1721: The Earl of Rothes
1722: The Earl of Loudoun
1723: The 1st Earl of Hopetoun
1724: The Earl of Findlater
1725–1726: The Earl of Loudoun
1727: The Earl of Findlater
1728: The Earl of Loudoun
1729: The Earl of Buchan
1730–1731: The Earl of Loudoun
1732–1738: The Marquess of Lothian
1739–1740: The Earl of Hyndford
1741–1753: The 5th Earl of Leven
1754: The 2nd Earl of Hopetoun
1755–1763: The Lord Cathcart
1764–1772: The 3rd Earl of Glasgow
1773–1776: The Lord Cathcart
1777–1782: The Earl of Dalhousie
1783–1801: The 6th Earl of Leven
1802–1816: The Lord Napier
1817–1818: The Earl of Erroll
1819–1824: The Earl of Morton
1825–1830: The Lord Forbes
1831–1841: The Lord Belhaven and Stenton
1842–1846: The Marquess of Bute
1847–1851: The Lord Belhaven and Stenton
1852: The Earl of Mansfield and Mansfield
1853–1857: The Lord Belhaven and Stenton
1858–1859: The Earl of Mansfield and Mansfield
1860–1866: The Lord Belhaven and Stenton
1867–1868: The Earl of Haddington
1869–1871: The 10th Earl of Stair
1872–1873: The Earl of Airlie
1874–1875: The Earl of Rosslyn
1876–1877: The Earl of Galloway
1878–1880: The Earl of Rosslyn
1881–1885: The Earl of Aberdeen
1886: The Lord Thurlow
1887–1889: The 7th Earl of Hopetoun
1889–1892: The Marquess of Tweeddale
1893–1895: The Marquess of Breadalbane
1896–1897: The Marquess of Tweeddale
1898–1906: The 11th Earl of Leven
1907–1909: The 11th Lord Kinnaird
1910: The 11th Earl of Stair
1911–1914: The Lord Glenconner
1915: The Earl of Aberdeen
1916–1917: The 5th Duke of Montrose
1918–1920: The 8th Duke of Atholl
1921–1922: The Duke of Sutherland
1923: The Lord Elphinstone
1924: James Brown MP (made a privy counsellor before serving again in 1930)
1925–1926: The 10th Earl of Elgin
1927–1928: The 12th Earl of Stair
1929: The Earl of Inverness
1930–1931: James Brown MP
1932: Sir Iain Colquhoun
1933–1934: John Buchan
1935: The Earl of St Andrews
1936–1937: The 12th Lord Kinnaird
1938–1939: Lt Col Sir John Gilmour, 2nd Bt
1940–1941: Sir Iain Colquhoun
1942–1943: The 6th Duke of Montrose
1944–1945: The Marquess of Linlithgow
1946–1947: George Mathers MP (made a privy counsellor before serving again in 1948)
1948: George Mathers MP
1949: The Lord Culloden
1950: The Viscount Cunningham of Hyndhope
1951: George Mathers MP
1952: The Viscount Cunningham of Hyndhope
1953–1955: The Duke of Hamilton
1956–1957: Walter Elliot MP
1958: The Duke of Hamilton
1959–1960: The Earl of Wemyss and March
1961–1963: The Lord Culloden
1964: General Sir Richard O'Connor
1965–1966: Lord Birsay
1967–1968: The Lord Reith
1969: The Queen attended in person
1970: Peggy Herbison
1971–1972: The Lord Clydesmuir
1973–1974: The Lord Ballantrae
1975–1976: Sir Hector MacLennan
1977: The Earl of Wemyss and March
1978–1979: Willie Ross (former Secretary of State for Scotland)
1980–1981: The 11th Earl of Elgin
1982–1983: Col Sir John Gilmour, 3rd Bt
1984–1985: The Lord Maclean
1986–1987: The Viscount of Arbuthnott
1988–1989: Captain Sir Iain Tennant
1990–1991: Lord Ross, Lord Justice Clerk
1992–1993: The Lord Macfarlane of Bearsden
1994–1995: Lady Fraser
1996: The Princess Royal
1997: The Lord Macfarlane of Bearsden
1998–1999: The Lord Hogg of Cumbernauld
2000: The Duke of Rothesay
2001: The Viscount Younger of Leckie
2002: The Queen attended in person
2003–2004: The Lord Steel of Aikwood
2005–2006: The Lord Mackay of Clashfern
2007: The Earl of Inverness
2008–2009: George Reid
2010–2011: The Lord Wilson of Tillyorn
2012–2013: The Lord Selkirk of Douglas
2014: The Earl of Wessex
2015–2016: The Lord Hope of Craighead
2017: The Princess Royal
2018–2019: The Duke of Buccleuch and Queensberry
2020–2021: The Earl of Strathearn (2020 Assembly cancelled due to the Covid-19 Pandemic.)
2022–23: The Lord Hodge

See also
 Supreme Governor of the Church of England
 List of Moderators of the General Assembly of the Church of Scotland
 Order of precedence in Scotland
 Lord Lieutenant
 Lord High Commissioner to the Parliament of Scotland

References

External links
Church of Scotland website

 
British monarchy-related lists
Church of Scotland